Sainte-Lucie-de-Beauregard Aerodrome  was located adjacent to Sainte-Lucie-de-Beauregard, Quebec, Canada.

References

Defunct airports in Quebec
Airports in Chaudière-Appalaches